St. Paul's Memorial Church is an Anglo-Catholic Episcopal parish in New York City, New York located at 225 St. Paul's Avenue in the Stapleton area of Staten Island.

The historic church was built in 1866 of rough-faced, irregularly cut blocks of Staten Island trap rock with brownstone trim.  It has buttressed side walls, a steeply pitched roof, and angled buttresses at the corners.  The front side features a central rose window. An auxiliary chapel was added in 1889. The rectory is also built of trap rock with brownstone trim.

It was added as "St. Paul's Memorial Church and Rectory" to the National Register of Historic Places in 1980.

See also
List of New York City Designated Landmarks in Staten Island
National Register of Historic Places listings in Richmond County, New York

Gallery

References

External links
St. Paul's Memorial Church website

Episcopal church buildings in Staten Island
Gothic Revival church buildings in New York City
Churches in Staten Island
New York City Designated Landmarks in Staten Island
Properties of religious function on the National Register of Historic Places in Staten Island
Churches completed in 1866
19th-century Episcopal church buildings
Edward Tuckerman Potter church buildings
1866 establishments in New York (state)
Anglo-Catholic church buildings in the United States
Stapleton Heights, Staten Island